Mubarkah Bent al-Barra (first name sometimes given as Batta; sometimes Mbarka Mint al-Barra') (born 1957) is a Mauritanian poet and translator.

Biography
Al-Barra was born in al-Madhardhara, and studied in public schools before graduating with a degree in education from the Teachers High Institute of Nouakchott in 1983.  In 1987 she received an MA in Maghrebi and Andalusian literatures from Mohammed V University.  She teaches in the Teachers High Institute. Al-Barra is bilingual in Arabic and French, but writes mainly in the former.

Al-Barra has extensively researched the oral poetry of Mauritania; more specifically, she has studied the tibra, a form of love poem whose recitation is restricted to all-female gatherings.  Some of these she has translated into French.  Her collection Taranimli-Watanin Wahid (Songs for a Country for All) was published in 1992, and Al-Shi'r al-Muritani al-Hadith, min 1970 ila 1995 (Modern Mauritanian Poetry, 1970-1995) was published in 1998. Some of her poetry has been anthologized in English. She also published a children's book, Hikayat Jaddati (My Grandmother's Tales), in 1997, and was co-editor of a volume of folktales as well. Al-Barra is prominent in Mauritanian cultural life, and has frequently attended literary festivals elsewhere in the Arab world.

References

1957 births
Living people
Mauritanian women writers
Mauritanian poets
Mauritanian women poets
20th-century poets
20th-century women writers
21st-century poets
21st-century women writers
Mohammed V University alumni